The Heavyweight class in the 1st AIBA African Olympic Boxing Qualifying Tournament competition was the lightest class.  Heavyweights were limited to those boxers weighing between 81 - 91 kilograms.

List of boxers

Medalists

Results

Quarterfinal Round

Semifinal Round

Final Round

Qualification to Olympic games

References
AIBA

AIBA African 2008 Olympic Qualifying Tournament